"You Can't Hurry Love" is a song by Swedish band The Concretes from their debut album The Concretes. Its original Scandinavian release as a single was in 2003. It was re-released in the United Kingdom on 14 June 2004. There are two videos for the song: 1) an animated version directed by Lisa Milberg and Liselotte Watkins with illustrations by Liselotte Watkins and Marika Åkerblom, animated by Måns Swanberg; 2) the second version directed by photographer Thomas Klementsson is made up of stills.

Track listings

2003 Scandinavian release
CD LFCD005
"You Can't Hurry Love" - 2:01
"Miss You" - 3:50

2004 UK release
7" LF7011
"You Can’t Hurry Love" - 2:01
"Under Your Leaves" - 3:26
CD LFS011
"You Can’t Hurry Love" - 2:01
"Free Ride" - 3:43
"Under Your Leaves" - 3:26
"You Can't Hurry Love" (video)

Charts

References

External links
"You Can't Hurry Love" track review at Pitchfork Media

2003 singles
2004 singles
2004 songs